Premalekhanam (Love Letter) is a 1985 film directed by P. A. Backer based on the novel of the same name by Vaikom Muhammad Basheer. The cast includes Soman, Swapna, Meena, Captain Raju, Vincent and Mala Aravindan.

Cast
 Soman as Kesavan Nair
 Swapna Khanna as Saramma Thomas
 Meena as Aliyama
 Captain Raju as Babu
 Vincent as Joykutty
 Mala Aravindan as Kunchan

External links
 

1985 films
1980s Malayalam-language films
Films directed by P. A. Backer
Films based on Indian novels